Murphy Bay is a bay 7 nautical miles (13 km) wide between Penguin Point and Cape Bage. Discovered by the Australasian Antarctic Expedition (1911–14) under Douglas Mawson, who named it for Herbert D. Murphy, a member of the expedition.

Bays of George V Land